Marietta College (MC) is a private liberal arts college in Marietta, Ohio. It offers more than 50 undergraduate majors across the arts, sciences, and engineering, as well as Physician Assistant, Psychology, Clinical Mental Health Counseling, and Athletic training graduate programs. Its campus encompasses approximately three city blocks next to downtown Marietta and enrolls 1,200 full-time students.

History
Marietta College began as the Muskingum Academy, in 1797, which was the birth of higher education in Ohio. In April 1797, which was only nine years after Ohio had been settled, a committee of Marietta citizens, led by General Rufus Putnam (the "Father of Ohio"), met to establish a college. The Muskingum Academy, completed late that year, became the first institution of its kind in the Northwest Territory, providing “classical instruction ... in the higher branches of an English education.” Its first instructor was David Putnam, a 1793 Yale graduate.

Academics
Marietta College is a Phi Beta Kappa liberal arts institution, requiring students complete courses Quantitative Reasoning, Artistic Expression, Civilization & Culture, Social Analysis, and Scientific Inquiry regardless of their major track. Additionally, students are required to have a secondary academic concentration, complete an out of classroom education experience, and achieve proficiency in a second language.

Scholarships 
The college offers several merit scholarships and awards based on incoming student's high school GPA, as well as several premier scholarships. High-achieving accepted students are invited to compete in a weekend-long series of tests and group interviews. The John G. McCoy scholarship is awarded to the top student, receiving full tuition, room and board. Trustee scholarships are awarded to other top students, receiving full tuition. The Rickey Scholarship is awarded to the top student pursuing a degree in physics, receiving full tuition. In 2019, the college began a new scholarship program, awarding up to five additional full tuition scholarships for students promoting social justice and inclusion in their community named the Charles Sumner Harrison awards after the first African-American graduate in 1876.

The Honors Program
There are three honors tracks: curriculum honors, research honors, and college honors. The curriculum honors track provides a course of study for accomplished students, requiring successful completion of five honors courses integrated within the general education requirement. The research honors designation varies across disciplines, but typically involves the writing and defense of a thesis. While most major programs require some form of student research, the honors designation can be achieved with deeper academic objectives or an interdisciplinary element. When a student completes the honors curriculum and successfully defends an honors thesis, they achieve college honors status.

Notable Degree Programs

Bachelor of Science in Petroleum Engineering 
Marietta College is the only liberal arts institution that offers a Bachelor of Science in Petroleum Engineering. In 2019, the college expanded their engineering offerings with a Bachelor of Science in Environmental Engineering.

Bachelor of Music in music therapy 
In 2017, the college unveiled a renovated McKinney Building with a new, state-of-the-art clinical observation rooms and recording studio.

Partnerships 
Marietta College maintains a partnership with the University of International Relations, a university with ties to the Ministry of State Security of the People's Republic of China.

Rankings
In 2021, Marietta was included in national rankings by U.S. News & World Report as #3 for Best Value Schools and #8 for Regional Colleges in the Midwest. College Factual ranked Marietta #20 out of 80 Ohio schools. In 2020, Washington Monthly ranked MC #62 for bachelor's degrees.

The McDonough Center for Leadership and Business 
The McDonough Center for Leadership and Business at Marietta College started in 1986 with a $5.5 million gift from the Bernard P. McDonough family. With an inaugural cohort of 28 students, the center originally only offered a Certificate in Leadership Studies. Through a collaborative process with faculty, students, college trustees, and community partners, the center evolved into its current shape, offering a bachelor's degree in International Leadership Studies, a minor, and a Certificate in Leadership Studies. In Fall 2008, the McDonough Center also launched its Teacher Leadership Certificate (TLC), a new academic program designed for students pursuing careers in education. Each of these degree and certificate offerings exists in a collaborative manner with the other academic programs at Marietta College to strengthen the students’ educational experience.

McDonough events 
 EXCEL (Experience Civic Engagement and Leadership) Workshop: All incoming McDonough Scholars are required to participate in this five-day event before the general new student orientation at the beginning of the fall semester. Upperclass EXCEL Leaders run this workshop and serve as mentors for the new leadership students. Participants are challenged to see themselves as active members of a new learning community.
 McDonough Leadership Conference: This national event brings together undergraduate and graduate leadership students from many different institutions around the world. The conference is planned and executed by McDonough Leadership Students.

Athletics 

Marietta College is a member of the NCAA Division III and the Ohio Athletic Conference, a 10-team collegiate conference founded in 1902 and the third-oldest in the nation. The Pioneers compete in 22 varsity sports, including teams in crew, baseball, basketball, football, women's volleyball, track & field, cross country, tennis, soccer, and softball.  They added men's and women's golf to the athletic department for the 2017 season, and lacrosse for 2018.

Marietta's baseball team has won six national championships, an NCAA Division III record: in 1981, 1983, 1986, 2006, 2011 and 2012.  The first three were under coach Don Schaly, who died on March 9, 2005; the three most recent under coach Brian Brewer. By repeating as the national champions in 2011 and 2012 the Pioneers became the first team to do that in NCAA Division III play since the Rowan Profs won back to back championships in 1978 and 1979. Five former Pioneer baseball players—Kent Tekulve, Duane Theiss, Jim Tracy, Terry Mulholland and Matt DeSalvo—have reached the Major League level.

Since 2010, the men's basketball program has averaged 21.9 victories a season since 2010.

The crew program competes at the annual Dad Vail Regatta each spring in both men's and women's events, and earned a gold medal in the Men's Varsity Eight in 2006, and gold medals in the Women's Varsity Eight in 2011, 2012, and 2014. Alumni include two-time Olympian and CEO of Boathouse Sports, John Strotbeck Jr., and 2003 World Championship silver medalist in the USA Lightweight Eight, Andrew Bolton.

Broadcasts
Marietta sporting events are often broadcast on WMRT FM, WCMO FM, and WCMO TV the college's two FM radio stations and TV channel. All of the football games are broadcast on WMRT. Home football, volleyball, soccer, basketball, softball, and baseball games are all carried on the Marietta College radio network. The baseball games are also carried on WMOA. WMRT and WCMO broadcasts are all produced and called entirely by students, many of whom are Mass Media students.

Greek Life
Alpha Sigma Phi (Delta Chapter), Alpha Tau Omega, Delta Tau Delta and Lambda Chi Alpha are national and international fraternities that have local chapters for male students to join. They are governed by an Interfraternity Council, which follows the guidelines of the North American Interfraternity Conference.

Alpha Xi Delta, Chi Omega, and Sigma Kappa are national and international fraternities and sororities that have local chapters for female students to join. They are governed by Panhellenic Council, which follows the guidelines of the National Panhellenic Conference.

Honoraries
Students attending Marietta College have the opportunity to qualify for any of 23 honoraries that have recognized chapters.

 Alpha Lambda Delta – Freshman
 Alpha Psi Omega – Drama
 Alpha Sigma Lambda – Non-Traditional
 Beta Beta Beta – Biology
 Gamma Sigma Alpha – Greek (Academic Honor Society)
 Kappa Delta Pi – Education
 Kappa Mu Epsilon – Mathematics
 Kappa Pi – Art
 Lambda Pi Eta – Communication
 Omicron Delta Epsilon – Economics
 Omicron Delta Kappa – Leadership
 Order of Omega – Greek (Leadership)
 Phi Alpha Theta – History
 Phi Beta Kappa – Academics
 Phi Sigma Iota – Foreign Language and Literature
 Pi Epsilon Tau – Petroleum Engineering
 Pi Kappa Delta – Speech and Debate
 Pi Sigma Alpha – Political Science
 Psi Chi – Psychology
 Sigma Delta Pi – Spanish
 Sigma Pi Sigma – Physics
 Sigma Tau Delta – English
 Society for Collegiate Journalists – Mass Communications
 Tau Pi Phi – Economics, Management, Accounting

Notable alumni
Alumni of Marietta College are collectively known as the Long Blue Line.

Government 
 Ray Barnhart – Federal Highway Administration director (1981–1987) and member of the Texas House of Representatives (1973–1975); Marietta College faculty member (1951–1955).
 E. Jocob Crull (attended in 1880–81) – Montana State Representative and colonel who was Jennette Rankin's (first female member of the U.S. Congress) chief primary rival.
 Charles Gates Dawes 1884 — U.S. vice president, Nobel Peace Prize Recipient, and U.S. Ambassador
 Glen Gainer Jr. – State Auditor of West Virginia, 1977–1993.
 William Irwin 1848 – 13th Governor of California.
 Carte Goodwin 1996 – U.S. Senator from West Virginia.
 C. William O'Neill 1938 – 59th Governor of Ohio.
 Walter Cowen Short (attended 1887–1888) - US Army brigadier general
 John M. Stowell – Mayor of Milwaukee, Wisconsin and member of the Wisconsin State Assembly.
Willard Warner 1845 – U.S. Senator from Alabama, 1868–71.
 Albert B. White – 11th Governor of West Virginia
 Joseph G. Wilson 1846 – U.S. Congressman from Oregon, justice on the Oregon Supreme Court.

Science and Academics 
 F. Story Musgrave 1960 – Retired NASA Astronaut and Shuttle Pilot.
 Wilbur Schramm 1928 – Founding Father of the Communication Studies Discipline.

Athletics 
 Dane Dastillung – American football player
 Ban Johnson 1887 – Founder of baseball's American League.
 Terry Mulholland 1985 – Former Major League Baseball pitcher.
 Don Schaly 1959 – ABCA Hall of Fame member, all-time winningest baseball coach in Division III history.
John Strotbeck Jr. – Former U.S. Olympic Rower and owner of Boathouse Sports.
 Kent Tekulve 1969 – Former Major League Baseball pitcher, Pittsburgh Pirates.
 Jim Tracy 1978 – Former Major League Baseball manager with the Colorado Rockies, Pittsburgh Pirates, and Los Angeles Dodgers.

Arts and Entertainment 
 Kathy Brodsky 1967 – American Author and Poet.
 Nick Gehlfuss 2007 – Actor
 Gary Kott 1969 – Award-winning television and advertising writer, and an American Folk Artist. A writer and supervising producer of The Cosby Show, Kott worked on the program during its five consecutive years of number one Nielsen ratings.
Joy Williams – an American novelist, short story writer, and essayist.

Other 
 Dean Hess 1941 – Clergyman, Soldier, Humanitarian.
Elsie Eaton Newton (1871-1941) – first Dean of Women at Marietta, daughter of John Eaton Jr.
 Andrea Parhamovich 2000 – National Democratic Institute employee killed in Baghdad, Iraq on January 17, 2007.

References

External links

 Official website
 The Marcolian, the student newspaper

 
Private universities and colleges in Ohio
Buildings and structures in Marietta, Ohio
Educational institutions established in 1835
Education in Washington County, Ohio
1835 establishments in Ohio